The Kawliya, Qawliya or Awaz, Keche-Hjälp, also known as Zott and Ghorbati (known in English as Gypsies), is a community in Iraq of Indian origin, estimated to number over 60,000 people. Today they speak mostly Arabic, while their ethnolect is a mixture of Persian, Kurdish and Turkish, only spoken by the older generations. The largest tribes are the Bu-Baroud, Bu-Swailem, Bu-Helio, Bu-Dakhil, Bu-Akkar, Bu-Murad, Bu-Thanio, Bu-Shati, Al-Farahedah, Al-Mtairat, Bu-Khuzam, Bu-Abd, Bu-Nasif, Bu-Delli and Al-Nawar. Their main occupation is entertainment, and also small trades.

The Kawliya migrated from India approximately 1,000 years ago. 

Kawliya is also the name of a former village in the Al-Qādisiyyah Governorate near Al Diwaniyah, located about 100 miles southeast of Baghdad, where they live.

See also
 Doms in Syria
 Nawar (people)
 Ghorbati

References

Further reading

Dom in the Middle East
Ethnic groups in Iraq
Modern nomads
Nomadic groups in Eurasia
Romani in Iraq